Erbil may refer to:

 Erbil, a city in the Kurdistan Region, Iraq
 Erbil Governorate, Kurdistan Region, Iraq

Given name
 Erbil Eroğlu (born 1993), Turkish basketball player

Surnames
 Mehmet Ali Erbil (born 1957), Turkish comedian, actor and talk show host
 Sinan Erbil (born 1965), Turkmen singer

Turkish unisex given names
Turkish-language surnames